Bathybembix is a genus of deep-water sea snails, marine gastropod molluscs in the family Eucyclidae.

This genus was originally called Bembix by Robert B. Watson (but as this was a junior homonym of Bembix Fabricius, 1775 [Hymenoptera], it was declared invalid. It was renamed in 1893 by Crosse as Bathybembix

Description
The shell has a conical shape with a high spire. It is carinated and umbilicated. The base of the shell is inflated. The shell is covered with a thin, extremely persistent, smooth, fibrous epidermis, The epidermis swells up and becomes pustulated in water. The axis of the shell is perforated, and the columella is thin, reverted, and merely angulated in front.

Species
Species within the genus Bathybembix include:
 Bathybembix abyssorum (Smith, 1891)
 Bathybembix aeola (Watson, 1879)
 Bathybembix bairdii (Dall, 1889)
 Bathybembix delicatula Dall, 1990
 Bathybembix drakei Dall, 1990
 Bathybembix galapagana (Dall, 1908)
 Bathybembix humboldti Rehder, 1971
 Bathybembix macdonaldi (Dall, 1890)
Species brought into synonymy
 Bathybembix ceratophora (Dall, 1896) accepted as Calliotropis ceratophora (Dall, 1896)
 Bathybembix equatorialis (Dall, 1896) accepted as Calliotropis equatorialis (Dall, 1896)

References

 Watson R. B. (1878-1883). Mollusca of H. M. S. Challenger Expedition. Journal of the Linnean Society of London, 14: 506–529, 586–605, 692-716 [1878-1879]; 15: 87–126, 217–230, 245, 274, 388, 412, 413–455, 457, 475 [1880-1881]; 16: 247–254, 324–343, 358–372, 373–392, 494-611 [1882-1883]; 17: 26–40, 112–130, 284–293, 319–340, 341-346
 Poppe G.T., Tagaro S.P. & Dekker H. (2006) The Seguenziidae, Chilodontidae, Trochidae, Calliostomatidae and Solariellidae of the Philippine Islands. Visaya Supplement 2: 1–228. page(s): 55

External links

 
Eucyclidae